KTXR ("98.7 the Dove") is a radio station licensed to Springfield, Missouri, United States broadcasting a soft adult contemporary format. The station was previously a sports talk format known as "JOCK 98.7 ESPN." This format moved to 98.7 FM's sister stations KBFL and KBFL-FM (1060 AM/96.9 FM/99.9 FM) on July 30, 2020 as part of the purchase of the Meyer Communications owned stations (which also includes KWTO and KWTO-FM) by Zimmer Midwest Communications.

History
KTXR went on the air as KWTO-FM on November 23, 1967; it later adopted a rock format and was known as "Rock 99". The name lasted well into the 1980s until rival station KXUS went on the air in April 1985 with a similar format. Rock 99 was originally an automated music format utilizing the TM Stereo Rock format based from Dallas, TX. Several FM radio stations used this format during the 1970s into the first two years of the 1980s. These stations had the same announcer and same call letter type music jingles. One example, WIBW-FM 97.3 in Topeka, KS was Rock 97 and sounded just like KWTO-FM Rock 99. That was a great automated music format without the talkative DJs; it was rock, pop, oldies, and some album cuts. The on-air format basically went like this: Two new songs followed by two older songs then commercial break (usually four commercials) then a call-letter jingle and back to the music.

In 1982, the station dropped its rock format to adopt a CHR format but retain its "Rock 99" name until 1986, when KWTO-FM became known as "99 Hit FM". It was Springfield's dominant CHR station throughout the 1980s and the early 1990s. The call letters were changed to KKHT in late 1990, and then the following year, the branding became "The Heart". In 1993, the station returned to its classic rock roots with the moniker "98.7 FM Rock 99" and changed the call letters back to KWTO-FM on February 14, 1994.

In 2001, the station adopted an all-sports format and became known as "The JOCK, 98.7 FM". The station became an affiliate of Fox Sports Radio but also carried The Jim Rome Show from CBS Sports Radio daily.

On October 23, 2014, it was announced that KWTO-FM would drop Fox Sports Radio and affiliate with ESPN Radio effective January 1, 2015. On the same date, Fox Sports Radio moved to KGMY, which was the previous ESPN Radio affiliate for Springfield.

On July 24, 2020, veteran on air sports personality Art Hains announced that the group of Meyer Communications owned radio stations were being purchased by Zimmer Midwest Communications and the JOCK sports format would be moving to the KBFL frequencies (1060 AM/96.9 FM/99.9 FM) in early August. He also advised that KWTO-FM would transition "into a frequency that's music and personality-driven." The JOCK began simulcasting on all of the KBFL signals on July 30, and unveiled a new logo reflecting the new frequencies "JOCK 96.9 FM 99.9 FM 1060 AM". ESPN on air promos branded the new stations as "ESPN the JOCK". The format fully transitioned to the KBFL frequencies as of August 7.

On August 11, 2020, KWTO-FM began broadcasting a soft rock format with the moniker "98.7 the Dove" after four days of stunting with Christmas Music. It would later switch its format to a mix of soft adult contemporary and classic hits formats, retaining its "Lite Rock" slogan. In an additional surprise move, Zimmer also swapped the call letters of 98.7 KWTO-FM with that of KTXR 101.3 FM. 98.7 the Dove immediately began identifying as KTXR. The call sign change was registered by the FCC on August 20. The station features the return of "The Kevin & Liz Show", a popular local morning duo who were previously on KGBX-FM (and on KTOZ-FM in years prior); their show was cancelled by iHeartMedia (owner of KGBX) in January 2020.

References

External links

Radio stations established in 1968
Classic hits radio stations in the United States
Soft adult contemporary radio stations in the United States
TXR
1968 establishments in Missouri